Peter Lamborn Wilson (October 20, 1945 – May 22, 2022) was an American anarchist author and poet, primarily known for his concept of Temporary Autonomous Zones, short-lived spaces which elude formal structures of control. During the 1970s, Wilson lived in the Middle East, where he explored mysticism and translated Persian texts. Starting from the 1980s he wrote (under the pen name of Hakim Bey) numerous political writings, illustrating his theory of "ontological anarchy". His style of anarchism has drawn criticism for its emphasis on individualism and mysticism, as did some of his writings where he defended pederasty.

Life
Wilson was born in Baltimore on October 20, 1945. While undertaking a classics major at Columbia University, Wilson met Warren Tartaglia, then introducing Islam to students as the leader of a group called the Noble Moors. Attracted by the philosophy, Wilson was initiated into the group, but later joined a group of breakaway members who founded the Moorish Orthodox Church. The Church maintained a presence at the League for Spiritual Discovery, the group established by Timothy Leary.

Appalled by the social and political climate, Wilson had also decided to leave the United States, and shortly after the assassination of Martin Luther King Jr., in 1968 he flew to Lebanon, eventually reaching India with the intention of studying Sufism, but became fascinated by Tantra, tracking down Ganesh Baba. He spent a month in a Kathmandu missionary hospital being treated for hepatitis, and practised meditation techniques in a cave above the east bank of the Ganges. He also allegedly ingested significant quantities of cannabis.

Wilson travelled on to Pakistan. There he lived in several places, mixing with princes, Sufis, and gutter dwellers, and moving from teahouses to opium dens. In Quetta he found "a total disregard of all government", with people reliant on family, clans or tribes, which appealed to him.

Wilson then moved to Iran. It was here that he developed his scholarship. He translated classical Persian texts with French scholar Henry Corbin, and also worked as a journalist at the Tehran Journal. In 1974, Farah Pahlavi Empress of Iran commissioned her personal secretary, scholar Seyyed Hossein Nasr, to establish the Imperial Iranian Academy of Philosophy. Nasr offered Wilson the position of director of its English language publications, and editorship of its journal Sophia Perennis. This Wilson edited from 1975 until 1978.

Following the Iranian Revolution in 1979, Wilson lived in New York City, sharing a brownstone townhouse with William Burroughs, with whom he bonded over their shared interests. Burroughs acknowledged Wilson for providing material on Hassan-i Sabbah which he used for his novel The Western Lands.

Wilson lived in upstate New York. A family trust fund enabled him to live in a state he termed "independently poor". He has been described as "a subcultural monument".

In 2020, in a personal letter to Wahid Azal of the Fatimiya Sufi Order, Wilson requested and was accepted as a Bayānī or Azali, a fact which he obliquely alluded to in his two final books published in early 2022.

Wilson died of heart failure on May 22, 2022, in Saugerties, New York.

Hakim Bey

Wilson took an interest in the 'zines' subculture flourishing in Manhattan in the early 1980s, 'zines' being tiny hand-made photocopied magazines published in small quantities concerning whatever the publishers found compelling. "He began writing essays, communiqués as he liked to call them, under the pen name Hakim Bey, which he mailed to friends and publishers of the 'zines' he liked.... His mailouts were immediately popular, and regarded as copyright-free syndicated columns ready for anyone to paste into their photocopied 'zines'..."

Wilson's occasional pen name of Hakim Bey is derived from il-Hakim, the alchemist-king, with 'Bey' a further nod to Moorish Science. Wilson's two personas, as himself and Bey, are facilitated by his publishers who provide separate author biographies even when both appear in the same publication.

His Temporary Autonomous Zones work has been referenced in comparison to the "free party" or teknival scene of the rave subculture. Wilson was supportive of the rave connection, while remarking in an interview, "The ravers were among my biggest readers ... I wish they would rethink all this techno stuff — they didn't get that part of my writing."

According to Gavin Grindon, in the 1990s, the  British group Reclaim the Streets was heavily influenced by the ideas put forward in Hakim Bey’s The Temporary Autonomous Zone. Their adoption of the carnivalesque into their form of protest evolved eventually into the first “global street party” held in cities across the world on 16 May 1998, the day of a G8 summit meeting in Birmingham. These “parties,” explains Grindon, in turn developed into the Carnivals Against Capitalism, in London on June 18, 1999, organized by Reclaim the Streets in coordination with worldwide antiglobalization protests called by the international network People’s Global Action during the G-8 summit meeting in Cologne, Germany.

More recently, he has commented on the Occupy Movement in an interview with David Levi Strauss of The Brooklyn Rail:

I was beginning to feel that there would never be another American uprising, that the energy was gone, and I have some reasons to think that might be true. I like to point out that the crime rate in America has been declining for a long time, and in my opinion it's because Americans don't even have enough gumption to commit crimes anymore: the creative aspect of crime has fallen into decay. As for the uprising that takes a principled stand against violence, hats off to them, I admire the idealism, but I don't think it's going to accomplish much.

In another interview with David Levi Strauss and Christopher Bamford in The Brooklyn Rail, Bey has discussed his views on what he calls "Green Hermeticism": 
We all agreed that there is not a sufficient spiritual focus for the environmental movement. And without a spiritual focus, a movement like this doesn't generate the kind of emotional energy that it needs to battle against global capitalism—that for which there is no other reality, according to most people. It should be a rallying call of the spirit for the environmental movement, or for as many parts of that movement as could be open to it.

Notable theories

Ontological anarchy
In the compilation of essays called "Immediatism" Wilson explains his particular conception of anarchism and anarchy which he calls "ontological anarchy". In the same compilation he deals with his view of the relationships of individuals with the exterior world as perceived by the senses and a theory of liberation which he calls "immediatism".

Temporary autonomous zones

Wilson penned articles on three different types of what he called temporary autonomous zones (TAZ). Regarding his concept of TAZ, he said the following in an interview: ... the real genesis was my connection to the communal movement in America, my experiences in the 1960s in places like Timothy Leary's commune in Millbrook ... Usually only the religious ones last longer than a generation—and usually at the expense of becoming quite authoritarian, and probably dismal and boring as well. I've noticed that the exciting ones tend to disappear, and as I began to further study this phenomenon, I found that they tend to disappear in a year or a year and a half.

In an article on obsessive love, Wilson posited a utopia based on generosity as well as obsession and wrote:

I have dreamed this (I remember it suddenly, as if it were literally a dream) — and it has taken on a tantalizing reality and filtered into my life—in certain Temporary Autonomous Zones—an "impossible" time and space ... and on this brief hint, all my theory is based.

As such, it may be said that it is part of the eternal vision of an arcadia where desires are fulfilled without reference to the world, and the search for a means of realising it.

The concept of TAZ was presented in a long elaboration in the book TAZ: The Temporary Autonomous Zone, Ontological Anarchy, Poetic Terrorism, published by Autonomedia in 1991. At the time of his death the book had sold over 50,000 copies and was the publisher's perennial bestseller.

Criticism and controversy
Murray Bookchin included Wilson's work (as Bey) in what he called "lifestyle anarchism", where he criticized Wilson's writing for tendencies towards mysticism, occultism, and irrationalism. Wilson did not respond publicly. Bob Black wrote a rejoinder to Bookchin in Anarchy after Leftism.

Some writers have been troubled by Bey's endorsement of adults having sex with children. Michael Muhammad Knight, a novelist and former friend of Wilson, stated that "writing for NAMBLA amounts to activism in real life. As Hakim Bey, Peter creates a child molester's liberation theology and then publishes it for an audience of potential offenders" and disavowed his former mentor. 

John Zerzan described Bey as a "postmodern liberal", possessing a "method" that was "as appalling as his claims to truthfulness, and essentially conforms to textbook postmodernism. Aestheticism plus knownothingism is the [...] formula; cynical as to the possibility of meaning, allergic to analysis,
hooked on trendy word-play", and "basically reformist".

Works
The Winter Calligraphy of Ustad Selim, & Other Poems (1975) (Ipswich, England) 
Science and Technology in Islam (1976) (with Leonard Harrow)
Traditional Modes of Contemplation & Action (1977) (editor, with Yusuf Ibish)
Nasir-I Khusraw: 40 Poems from the Divan (1977) (translator and editor, with Gholamreza Aavani) 
DIVAN (1978) (poems, London/Tehran)
Kings of Love: The Poetry and History of the Nimatullahi Sufi Order of Iran (1978) (translator and editor, with Nasrollah Pourjavady; Tehran)
Angels (1980, 1994) 
Weaver of Tales: Persian Picture Rugs (1980) (with Karl Schlamminger)
Divine Flashes (1982) (by Fakhruddin 'Iraqi, translated and introduced with William C. Chittick; Paulist Press (Mahwah, New Jersey)) 
Crowstone: The Chronicles of Qamar (1983) (as Hakim)
CHAOS: The Broadsheets of Ontological Anarchism (1985) (as Hakim Bey; Grim Reaper Press (Weehawken, New Jersey))
Semiotext(e) USA (1987) (co-editor, with Jim Fleming)
Scandal: Essays in Islamic Heresy (1988) (Autonomedia (Brooklyn, New York)) 
The Drunken Universe: An Anthology of Persian Sufi Poetry (1988) (translator and editor, with Nasrollah Pourjavady) 
Semiotext(e) SF (1989) (co-editor, with Rudy Rucker and Robert Anton Wilson)
The Universe:  A Mirror of Itself (1992?) (Xexoxial Editions (La Farge, Wisconsin))
Aimless Wanderings: Chuang Tzu's Chaos Linguistics (1993) (as Hakim Bey; Xexoxial Editions (La Farge, Wisconsin))
Sacred Drift: Essays on the Margins of Islam (1993) (City Lights Books (San Francisco)) 
The Little Book of Angel Wisdom (1993, 1997)  
O Tribe That Loves Boys: The Poetry of Abu Nuwas (1993) (translator and editor, as Hakim Bey) 
Pirate Utopias: Moorish Corsairs and European Renegadoes (1995, 2003) (Autonomedia (Brooklyn, New York)) 
Millennium (1996) (as Hakim Bey; Autonomedia (Brooklyn, New York) and Garden of Delight (Dublin, Ireland)) 
"Shower of Stars" Dream & Book: The Initiatic Dream in Sufism and Taoism (1996) (Autonomedia (Brooklyn, New York)) 
Escape from the Nineteenth Century and Other Essays (1998) (Autonomedia (Brooklyn, New York)) 
Wild Children (1998) (co-editor, with Dave Mandl)
Avant Gardening: Ecological Struggle in the City & the World (1999) (co-editor, with Bill Weinberg) 
Ploughing the Clouds: The Search for Irish Soma (1999) 
TAZ: The Temporary Autonomous Zone, Ontological Anarchy, Poetic Terrorism, Second Edition (2003) (as Hakim Bey; incorporates full text of CHAOS and Aimless Wanderings; Autonomedia (Brooklyn, New York)) 
Orgies of the Hemp Eaters (2004) (co-editor as Hakim Bey with Abel Zug) 
rain queer (2005) (Farfalla Press (Brooklyn, New York)) 
Cross-Dressing in the Anti-Rent War (Portable Press at Yo-Yo Labs chapbook, 2005)
Gothick Institutions (2005) 
Green Hermeticism:  Alchemy and Ecology; (with Christopher Bamford and Kevin Townley, Lindisfarne (2007)) 
Black Fez Manifesto as Hakim Bey (2008) 
Atlantis Manifesto (2nd edition, 2009) Shivastan Publishing limited edition
Abecedarium (2010) 
Ec(o)logues (Station Hill of Barrytown, 2011) 
Nostalgia/Utopia with Francesco Clemente (Hirmer Publishers, Mary Boone Gallery, 2012) 
Spiritual Destinations of an Anarchist (2014) 
Spiritual Journeys of an Anarchist (2014) 
Riverpeople (2014) 
Opium Dens I Have Known with Chris Martin (2014) Shivastan Publishing limited edition
Anarchist Ephemera (2016) 
False Documents (Barrytown/Station Hill Press, Inc., 2016) 
Heresies: Anarchist Memoirs, Anarchist Art (2016) 
School of Nite with Nancy Goldring (2016) 
Night Market Noodles and Other Tales (2017) 
The Temple of Perseus at Panopolis (2017) 
Vanished Signs (2018) 
Lucky Shadows (2018) 
The New Nihilism (Bottle of Smoke Press, 2018) 
Utopian Trace: An Oral Presentation (2019) 
The American Revolution as a Gigantic Real Estate Scam: And Other Essays in Lost/Found History (2019) 
Cauda Pavonis: Esoteric Antinomianism in the Yezidi Tradition (2019) 
Hoodoo Metaphysics with Tamara Gonzales (Bearpuff Press, 2019) 
False Messiah: Crypto-Xtian Tracts and Fragments (2022) 
Peacock Angel: The Esoteric Tradition of the Yezidis (2022)

References

Further reading 

 Rabinowitz, Jacob "Blame It On Blake: A Memoir of Dead Languages, Gender Vagrancy, Burroughs, Ginsberg, Corso & Carr" (2019), . Section 6 (comprising 4 chapters, pages 155–179) concerns Peter Lamborn Wilson / Hakim Bey
 Greer, Joseph Christian. "Occult Origins: Hakim Bey's Ontological Post-Anarchism." Anarchist Developments in Cultural Studies 2 (2014).
 Sellars, Simon. "Hakim Bey: repopulating the temporary autonomous zone." Journal for the Study of Radicalism 4.2 (2010): 83–108.
 Armitage, John. "Ontological anarchy, the temporary autonomous zone, and the politics of cyberculture a critique of hakim bey." Angelaki: Journal of the Theoretical Humanities 4.2 (1999): 115–128.
 Ward, Colin. "Temporary Autonomous Zones." Freedom, (1997).
 Bookchin, Murray. Social anarchism or lifestyle anarchism: an unbridgeable chasm. Edinburgh: AK Press, 1995.
 Shantz, Jeff. "Hakim Bey's Millenium." Alternate Routes: A Journal of Critical Social Research 15 (1999).
 Rousselle, Duane, and Süreyya Evren, eds. Post-anarchism: a reader. Pluto Press, 2011.

External links

 July 2004 interview from The Brooklyn Rail
 Audio of 1993 talk featuring Hakim Bey
 Roots of Rebellion audio interview with Hakim Bey
 Christian Greer, 'Hakim Bey', Chapter 43 in Christopher Partridge (ed.), The Occult World (2014)
 Living Under Sick Machines (2014)

1945 births
2022 deaths
Pedophile advocacy
American anarchists
American occult writers
American male poets
Anarchist theorists
Anarchist writers
Columbia College (New York) alumni
Individualist anarchists
Postanarchists
Egoist anarchists
American male non-fiction writers
People from Saugerties, New York